River Douglas may refer to:

River Douglas, Lancashire
River Douglas, Isle of Man

See also 
Douglas Water (disambiguation)